The Film That Changed My Life (also known as The Film That Changed My Life: 30 Directors on Their Epiphanies in the Dark) is a non-fiction collection of interviews compiled by American journalist, author and film columnist Robert K. Elder.  The book presents interviews with thirty famous directors who share stories about the movies that affected their career paths and directing styles.

Chapter list
 Edgar Wright on An American Werewolf in London
 Rian Johnson on Annie Hall
 Danny Boyle on Apocalypse Now
 Bill Condon on Bonnie and Clyde
 Richard Kelly on Brazil
 Peter Bogdanovich on Citizen Kane
 John Dahl on A Clockwork Orange
 Henry Jaglom on 8½
 Brian Herzlinger on E.T.: The Extra-Terrestrial
 Alex Gibney on The Exterminating Angel
 Kimberly Peirce on The Godfather
 Steve James on Harlan County, USA
 Austin Chick on Kings of the Road
 Guy Maddin on L’âge d’Or
 Michel Gondry  on Le voyage en ballon
 Michael Polish on Once Upon a Time in America
 Arthur Hiller on Rome, Open City
 Pete Docter on Paper Moon
 Atom Egoyan on Persona
 Gurinder Chadha on Purab aur Pachhim and It’s a Wonderful Life
 Richard Linklater on Raging Bull
 Jay Duplass on Raising Arizona
 John Woo on Rebel Without a Cause and Mean Streets
 John Landis on The 7th Voyage of Sinbad
 Kevin Smith on Slacker
 Chris Miller on Sleeper
 Neil LaBute on The Soft Skin
 George A. Romero on The Tales of Hoffmann
 Frank Oz on Touch of Evil
 John Waters on The Wizard of Oz

See also
The Best Film You've Never Seen

References

External links
 The Film That Changed My Life Official website
 Time Out Chicago Excerpts from Author's Column
 Zimbio Interview with Robert K. Elder by Bob Andelman
 CT Atlanta Culture Surfing review
 Filmspotting Podcast interview with the author

2011 non-fiction books
Books about film
Chicago Review Press books
American non-fiction books
Books of interviews